Dalima delineata is a moth of the family Geometridae. It is found in Peninsular Malaysia, Sumatra and Borneo.

External links
The Moths of Borneo

Boarmiini
Moths described in 1894